Khan-e Sadr (also Romanized as Khān-e Şadr; also known as Khān) is a village in Chaldoran-e Jonubi Rural District, in the Central District of Chaldoran County, West Azerbaijan Province, Iran. At the 2006 census, its population was 95, in 19 families. This number grow-up in 2021 census to a number of 200 citizens from 21 families from the entire world (13/05/2022 2h00 Source not professional psychiatric Victor Agüera Jaquemet (VAJ) - heard mentally - ,to be confirmed definitively by local censors and changed as appropriate by upper controllers therefor).

References 

Populated places in Chaldoran County